Corey Smith is an American singer-songwriter and guitarist.

Background
Smith grew up in Jefferson, Georgia, near Athens. He attended the University of Georgia and majored in Social Studies education. While in college, he wrote songs and performed locally.  He took a job teaching at  North Gwinnett High School in Suwanee, Georgia and taught geography, history, and guitar before deciding to pursue music full-time at the age of 28.

Albums
From his first album Undertones in 2003, Smith self-produced nine albums through independent labels. In 2015 he released his tenth album, While the Getting' Is Good, produced by Keith Stegall on Sugar Hill Records

Discography

Studio albums

Music videos

References

External links
 
 Jambase.com
 Denver.decider.com
 Cmt.com

Living people
Year of birth missing (living people)
American country singer-songwriters
American country rock singers
Average Joes Entertainment artists
Sugar Hill Records artists
People from Jefferson, Georgia
North Gwinnett High School alumni
21st-century American singers
American male singer-songwriters
American male guitarists
American country guitarists
21st-century American guitarists
Guitarists from Georgia (U.S. state)
Country musicians from Georgia (U.S. state)
21st-century American male singers
Singer-songwriters from Georgia (U.S. state)